Altin Grbović (Serbian Cyrillic: Алтин Грбовић; born 13 March 1986 in Novi Pazar) is a Serbian former footballer. He quit professional playing in 2014. The last professional club was Sabah from Malaysia.
He is football agent now and he is member of the staff in FK Novi Pazar.

He played for Serbia & Montenegro U18.

Honours
Skënderbeu Korçë

 SuperSport Trophy (1): 2010–11

References

External links

1986 births
Living people
Serbia and Montenegro footballers
Serbian footballers
KF Skënderbeu Korçë players
FC Delta Dobrogea Tulcea players
Association football forwards